The 2004 United States Senate election in Florida took place on November 2, 2004 alongside other elections to the United States Senate in other states as well as elections to the United States House of Representatives and various state and local elections. Incumbent Democratic U.S. Senator Bob Graham decided to retire instead of seeking a fourth term. Graham made an unsuccessful bid for the Democratic presidential nomination. The primary elections were held on August 31, 2004. Republican Mel Martínez won the open seat with 49.4% of the vote to Democratic nominee Betty Castor's 48.3%. With a margin of 1.1%, this election was the closest race of the 2004 Senate election cycle.

Democratic primary

Candidates 
 Betty Castor, former President of the University of South Florida, former Education Commissioner of Florida, and former State Senator
 Peter Deutsch, U.S. Representative from Broward County
 Bernard Klein, businessman
 Alex Penelas, Mayor of Miami-Dade County

Results

Republican primary 
Martínez was supported by the Bush Administration.

Candidates 
 Johnnie Byrd, State Representative from Plant City
 Doug Gallagher, businessman
 Larry Klayman, attorney
 William Kogut
 Sonya March
 Mel Martínez, former Secretary of Housing and Urban Development and candidate for Lieutenant Governor in 1994
 Bill McCollum, former U.S. Representative and candidate for U.S. Senate in 2000
 Karen Saull

Results

General election

Candidates 
 Dennis Bradley (V), activist
 Betty Castor (D), former State Senator
 Mel Martínez (R), Secretary of Housing and Urban Development

Predictions

Polling

Results

See also 
 2004 United States Senate elections

References

External links 
 WTSP-TV (Tampa Bay) website
 WKMG-TV (Orlando) website
Debates
 Florida Senate General Election Debate on C-SPAN, October 18, 2004
 Florida Senate General Election Debate on C-SPAN, October 25, 2004
Official campaign websites (archived)
Democrats
 Betty Castor
 Peter Deutsch
 Alex Penelas
 Bernard E. Klein

Republicans
 Mel Martínez
 Bill McCollum
 Doug Gallagher
 Johnnie Byrd
 Sonya March
 Larry Klayman
 William Billy Kogut

Politics of Florida
2004 Florida elections
Florida
2004